Debate has occurred throughout Africa over proposals to legalize same-sex marriage as well as civil unions.

Currently, South Africa is the only African country that legally recognizes same-sex marriage. In addition, the Spanish regions of the Canary Islands, Ceuta and Melilla, as well as the Portuguese territory of Madeira, the French territories of Mayotte and Réunion and the British Overseas Territory of St. Helena, Ascension and Tristan da Cunha recognize and perform same-sex marriage.

Civil partnerships or de facto unions are also recognized in South Africa, and the French, Spanish and Portuguese territories.

Current situation

National level

Partially-recognized and unrecognized states

Sub-national level

Public opinion

See also 
 LGBT rights in Africa
 Recognition of same-sex unions in the Americas
 Recognition of same-sex unions in Asia
 Recognition of same-sex unions in Europe
 Recognition of same-sex unions in Oceania

Notes

References